Del Young may refer to:

Del Young (outfielder) (1885-1959), Major League Baseball outfielder from 1909 to 1915
Del Young (infielder) (1912-1979), Major League Baseball from 1937 to 1940